Aryab is a sub-district located in Yarim District, Ibb Governorate, Yemen. Aryab had a population of 27377 as of  2004.

References 

Sub-districts in Yarim District